The 1930 Simmons Cowboys football team was an American football team that represented Simmons University (later known as Hardin-Simmons University) as a member of the Texas Conference during the 1930 college football season. In its first season under head coach Les Cranfill, the team compiled a 5–1–4 record and outscored opponents by a total of 142 to 45.

Schedule

References

Simmons
Hardin–Simmons Cowboys football seasons
Simmons Cowboys football